Međurić  is a village in Croatia. Međurić is known as Mezurač in Czech.

Populated places in Sisak-Moslavina County
Kutina